This is a summary of 1940 in music in the United Kingdom.

Events
30 January – Sophie Wyss gives the first complete performance of Benjamin Britten's Les Illuminations, with Boyd Neel conducting his Orchestra at the Wigmore Hall, London.
28 March – Antonio Brosa gives the first performance of Britten's Violin Concerto with the New York Philharmonic Orchestra conducted by John Barbirolli in Carnegie Hall, New York.
21 April – Michael Tippett's Concerto for Double String Orchestra is given its first performance in London.
May – Ilona Kabos and Louis Kentner record William Walton's Duets for Children for Columbia.
22 June – John Ireland is evacuated from Guernsey just over a week before the island is invaded by Germany.
date unknown – D'Oyly Carte bass L. Radley Flynn marries contralto Ella Halman.

Popular music
 "All Over The Place" w. Frank Eyton m. Noel Gay.  Introduced by Tommy Trinder in the film Sailors Three.
 "Let The People Sing" w.m. Noel Gay, Ian Grant & Frank Eyton

Classical music: new works
Granville Bantock – Celtic Symphony
Lennox Berkeley – Symphony No. 1
Benjamin Britten – Sinfonia da Requiem
William Walton – The Wise Virgins (ballet)

Film and Incidental music
Richard Addinsell – Gaslight, starring Anton Walbrook and Diana Wynyard.
Bretton Byrd – A Window in London, starring Michael Redgrave.
Ernest Irving – Sailors Three
Louis Levy – Night Train to Munich directed by Carol Reed, starring Margaret Lockwood and Rex Harrison.

Musical theatre
 5 March – The Beggar's Opera (Music and Lyrics: John Gay adapted by Frederic Austin). London revival, directed by John Gielgud, opened at the Haymarket Theatre.
 20 March – White Horse Inn (Music: Ralph Benatzky Lyrics and Book: Harry Graham).  London revival opened at the London Coliseum and ran for 268 performances until ended by bombing raids.
11 April – New Faces London revue opened at the Comedy Theatre, then moved to the Apollo Theatre on 14 March 1941.
27 August – Apple Sauce (Music and Lyrics: Michael Carr & Jack Strachey). London production opened at the Holborn Empire, then moved to the London Palladium on 5 March 1941, after the Holborn Empire was destroyed in the Blitz.  Total run 462 performances.

Musical films
 Laugh It Off, starring Tommy Trinder, Jean Colin, Anthony Hulme and Marjorie Browne.

Births
7 June – Tom Jones, singer
23 June – Adam Faith, singer and actor (died 2003)
4 July – Dave Rowberry, English pianist and songwriter (The Animals) (died 2003)
7 July – Ringo Starr, drummer of The Beatles
10 July – Brian Priestley, English pianist and composer (National Youth Jazz Orchestra)
19 August – Roger Cook, songwriter
9 October – John Lennon, singer and songwriter (died 1980)
14 October – Cliff Richard, singer
23 October –Tom McGrath, jazz pianist and playwright (died 2009)
15 November – Hank Wangford, singer-songwriter, guitarist, and physician
25 December – Pete Brown, performance poet and lyricist

Deaths
31 March – Achille Rivarde, American-born violinist and teacher, 74
10 July – Sir Donald Tovey, musicologist and composer, 64
16 December – William Wallace, composer, 80

See also
 1940 in British television
 1940 in the United Kingdom
 List of British films of 1940

References

 
British music by year